

Werner Rudolph Anton (3 April 1895 – 12 September 1948) was a German general in the Luftwaffe during World War II who commanded the 6. Flak-Division.  He was a recipient of the Knight's Cross of the Iron Cross.

Awards and decorations
 Iron Cross (1914) 2nd Class (4 February 1915) & 1st Class (22 August 1918)
 Order of Albert the Bear, Knight's Cross 2nd Class with Swords Military Order of St. Henry (19 February 1916)
 Military Order of St. Henry (20 November 1916)
 Honour Cross of the World War 1914/1918 (21 December 1934)
 Anschluss Medal (16 December 1938)
 Wehrmacht Long Service Award 4th to 2nd Class (2 October 1936) & 1st Class (22 August 1939)
 Clasp to the Iron Cross (1939) 2nd and 1st Class
 Anti-Aircraft Flak Battle Badge (12 September 1942)
 German Cross in Gold on 29 April 1943 as Generalmajor and in the Flak-Division 6
 Knight's Cross of the Iron Cross on 11 June 1944 as Generalmajor and commander of 6. Flak-Division

References

Citations

Bibliography

 
 
 

1895 births
1948 deaths
Military personnel from Dresden
Luftwaffe World War II generals
German Army personnel of World War I
People from the Kingdom of Saxony
Recipients of the clasp to the Iron Cross, 1st class
Recipients of the Gold German Cross
Recipients of the Knight's Cross of the Iron Cross
German prisoners of war in World War II held by the United Kingdom
Lieutenant generals of the Luftwaffe